Saura may refer to:

 Saura (Hinduism), a Hindu denomination
 Saura calendar, the Vedic and medieval Indian solar calendar

People 
 Antonio Saura, Spanish surrealist artist
 Carlos Saura, Spanish film director 
 Enrique Saura, Spanish footballer
 Joan Saura, Spanish politician
 Santiago Saura Martínez de Toda, Spanish engineer, professor and politician

Places 
 Saura, Nordland, a village in Nesna, Norway
 Saura, Norway, a village in Gildeskål, Norway
 Saura Mountains, mountains in North Carolina, USA

See also 
 Cheraw people, a Native American tribe, also known as the Saraw or Saura, who lived in the Saura mountains
 Saura painting, a style of mural painting associated with Saura tribes of Odisha, India